Indianhead may refer to:

Indianhead Mountain, a mountain in the Upper Peninsula of Michigan, United States
Wisconsin Indianhead Technical College, a two-year college with four campuses in Wisconsin: Ashland, New Richmond, Rice Lake, and Superior
Indianhead International School, a school in Howon-Dong, Uijeongbu, South Korea
Indianhead Council, the former name of the Northern Star Council
Indianhead Ski Area, an area of Geneva Basin Ski Area
Indianhead Poker, an alternate name for the poker game Blind man's bluff
Indianhead bow, a McManus bow

See also
Indian Head (disambiguation)